The Consolidated R2Y "Liberator Liner" (Consolidated Model 39) was an airliner derivative of the B-24 Liberator built for the United States Navy by Consolidated Aircraft.

Development and service
The XR2Y-1, as the single prototype was known in Navy service, used the high-aspect wing and tricycle landing gear of the Liberator. The fuselage was an entirely new design, and the vertical stabilizer was taken from the PB4Y Privateer. The final design looked much like a smaller, high-wing Boeing B-29 Superfortress, but with windows for passengers.

The aircraft was meant to carry passengers or cargo to distant Navy bases, but after a brief evaluation the prototype was demilitarized in the mid-1940s, returned to Convair, and leased to American Airlines as a freighter with the name "City of Salinas".

Specifications (R2Y-1)

See also

References

External links

 NX30039 American Airlines

Consolidated R2Y
R2Y
Four-engined tractor aircraft
High-wing aircraft
Aircraft first flown in 1944
1940s United States airliners
Four-engined piston aircraft